Teodoro de Lellis or Teodoro Lelli (died 1466) was a Roman Catholic prelate who served as Bishop of Treviso (1464–1466) 
and Bishop of Feltre (1462–1464).

Biography
On 15 February 1462, Teodoro de Lellis was appointed during the papacy of Pope Pius II as Bishop of Feltre.

On 17 September 1464, he was appointed during the papacy of Pope Paul II as Bishop of Treviso.
He served as Bishop of Treviso until his death on 31 March 1466.

References

External links and additional sources
  (for Chronology of Bishops) 
  (for Chronology of Bishops) 
  (for Chronology of Bishops) 
  (for Chronology of Bishops) 

15th-century Italian Roman Catholic bishops
Bishops appointed by Pope Pius II
Bishops appointed by Pope Paul II
1466 deaths